This article discusses the structure of football leagues in the Czech Republic. These leagues are organised by The Football Association of the Czech Republic (FAČR). Football is the most popular sport in the Czech Republic.

History
Bohemia was an early adopter of football. In the Czech Republic, football originated in Bohemia between 1890 and 1900, mainly played by Germans (the country was part of the Austro-Hungarian empire). The best German club was called Regatta Prag. The first known football match in the Czech Republic occurred on the islet located in the Labe River in Roudnice nad Labem in 1887. In 1896 the first derby between SK Slavia Prague and AC Sparta Prague was disputed with the result of 0-1. In 1896, the first Czech championship, won by CFK Kickers Prague (spring) and Deutscher FC Prag (autumn) was disputed. In 1897 the Czech Crown championship was won, won by Slavia and in 1902 the Czech Football Association championship won by the Cesky AFC Vinohrady. Czechoslovak First League  was the premier football league in the Czechoslovakia from 1925 to 1993.

In 1901 the Czech Football Federation was created. Between 1903 and 1908, the selection of soccer of Bohemia disputed seven international parties. Subsequently, between 1922 and 1993, the selection and federation of the Czech Republic became the respective ones of Czechoslovakia. As of this last year, the organizations of the Czech Republic revived, again as an independent state.

League system
The highest level is also known as 1st league - officially Fortuna: liga. The winner and team finishing second are promoted from the 2nd Division.

The 2. liga (Second Division) is at the second tier of the football pyramid. The winners of the ČFL and MSFL are promoted to this division, making two clubs in total. Sometimes when two clubs are relegated to the same 3rd division (for example to MSFL), the MSFL relegates three clubs instead of the usual two. (example: We have got two downward clubs from 2nd league - from Moravia - to MSFL. From MSFL one club will be promoted and three clubs will be relegated to Moravia-Silesia Divisions (D and E) for the next season. Normally two teams are relegated from the MSFL and three from the ČFL).

Winners of the Czech Fourth Division Bohemian groups (A,B,C) are promoted to the ČFL, whilst in Moravia-Silesia groups (D,E) the teams are promoted to the MSFL.

Winners of Regional Championships are promoted to the Fourth Division. (Example: Winner of the Prague Championship is promoted to Division A)

National team

Before the break-up of the country, Czech players represented Czechoslovakia, whose national team was for many years one of the leading teams in the world. Since the break-up of Czechoslovakia the Czech national team has had success in Euro 96 and Euro 2004. The selection of the Czech Republic national teams is controlled by the Football Federation of the Czech Republic.

The Czech team played their first official game on February 23, 1994 in Istanbul against Turkey, winning 4-1. The Czech Republic has managed to qualify for one FIFA World Cup and five European Championships. The greatest achievement of the Czech team was reaching the final of Euro 96 in England, eliminating Portugal and France to reach the final against Germany. On June 30, 1996 at Wembley Stadium, the Czech team lost the final 2-1 to Germany after taking the lead with a goal from Patrik Berger, before losing to an extra-time golden goal scored by Oliver Bierhoff. The following year they participated in the FIFA Confederations Cup held in Saudi Arabia, being eliminated in the semifinals after a 2-0 defeat to Brazil.

At the time when the country was part of Czechoslovakia, the national team achieved victory in the 1976 European Championship against Germany in a penalty shoot-out, thanks to the famous penalty of Antonin Panenka. The Czechoslovak team qualified for the World Cup on eight occasions, finishing runners-up in both 1934 and 1962, as well as appearing in three other European Championships.

Women's football

Women's football is well organised in the Czech republic. The women's team debuted on July 21, 1993 before the Slovak national team in a match won by the Czechs 6-0. The women's team of the Czech Republic has not yet participated in a final phase of the World Cup or the European Championship.

Prague
Prague has six professional football teams and a total of 14 in the top four divisions of national competition.

Below the fourth tier, the Prague Football Association organises the fifth-tier Prague Championship, which is contested by 16 teams, all of which are based in Prague.

Stadia and locations

Clubs
The table below lists all Prague clubs in the top four tiers of the Czech football league system: from the top division (the Czech First League), down to the Czech Fourth Division. League status is correct for the 2014–15 season.

Administration
Prague is the location of the headquarters of the Football Association of the Czech Republic, in Diskařská street.

See also
Czech Republic football league system
List of football stadiums in the Czech Republic

References

External links
  League321.com - Czech Republic football league tables, records & statistics database.
Czech Republic football league ratest scores,scheduled(flashscore)

 

tr:Çek futbolunda lig sistemi